There are 24 known disc golf courses in Quebec. , 23 of them are listed on the official PDGA Course Directory. 11 of them (%) are full-size courses with 18 holes or more, and 12 of them (%) are smaller courses that feature at least 9 holes.

See also 
List of disc golf courses in Canada

Notes

References

 
Quebec
Disc golf courses
Disc golf courses, Quebec